Lea Fabbri (born 14 January 1985 in Zagreb, SFR Yugoslavia) is a Croatian female basketball player.

External links
Profile at eurobasket.com

1985 births
Living people
Basketball players from Zagreb
Croatian women's basketball players
Power forwards (basketball)
Small forwards